German Class 45 steam locomotives were standard locomotives (Einheitslokomotiven) designed by the Deutsche Reichsbahn for hauling goods trains.

History 
The Class 45 engines were the most powerful steam locomotives ever operated in Germany. They were built between 1936 and 1937 by the firm of Henschel. After the first two engines entered service, a further 26 units were delivered in 1940. However, the third order for another 103 machines was cancelled in 1941, because the outbreak of the Second World War favoured the construction of simpler wartime locomotives, the so-called Kriegslokomotiven. The Class 45s were given the operating numbers 45 001 – 45 028.

After the war, boiler damage appeared very quickly that made a reduction of the boiler overpressure to 16 bar necessary. From 1950 therefore several Deutsche Bundesbahn machines were equipped with an outer firebox with a combustion chamber and a mechanical underfeed stoker (Rostbeschicker). The engines with operating numbers 45 010, 45 016, 45 019, 45 021 and 45 023 were provided with welded boilers and underfeed stoker equipment.

In East Germany, the Deutsche Reichsbahn's sole example, 45 024, was rebuilt into high pressure variant and renumbered H 45 024. It proved to be a failure and was retired in 1959. Parts of this locomotive (outside cylinders, trailing wheels and the rear section of the locomotive frame) were used in building engine no. 18 201.

In 1968 the Deutsche Bundesbahn only had three examples left, which were used as braking and experimental engines by the Bundesbahn Central Office in Munich and Minden. They were no. 45 023, which was stabled in Munich, and nos. 45 010 and 45 019, which were stationed at Minden. On the evening of 17 October 2005 a fire destroyed the locomotive shed of the Nuremberg Transport Museum in Nuremberg, as a result of which the last preserved example of this class, the 45 010, was badly damaged. Plans were put in hand to restore it and this was completed during 2012.

This class was initially a faulty design, similar to the DRB Class 06, because of its poor boiler. Following replacement of the boiler and the introduction of mechanical stoking the true qualities of this locomotive became clear. As well as being used as braking locomotives for the Bundesbahn Central Office, in their final years numbers 45 019 and 45 010 were used time and again for those heavy goods train duties that the Class 44 locomotives had difficulties with.

The vehicles were coupled with 2'3 T 38 tenders. Those with underfeed stokers had 2'3 T 29 Stoker tenders.

See also 

 List of DRG locomotives and railbuses

References 

 
 

45
1′E1′ h3 locomotives
45
Henschel locomotives
Railway locomotives introduced in 1936
Standard gauge locomotives of Germany
2-10-2 locomotives
Freight locomotives